Colonel George Bridges Stevens CBE VD was an acting Commander of the Ceylon Defence Force. He was appointed on 14 December 1928 until 28 April 1929. He was succeeded by Edward Bromfield Ferrers.

References

Commanders of the Ceylon Defence Force
Royal Hampshire Regiment officers
British Army personnel of World War I
Commanders of the Order of the British Empire